Slovakia competed at the 1998 Winter Paralympics in Nagano, Japan. 18 competitors from Slovakia won 10 medals, 6 silver and 4 bronze, and finished 18th in the medal table.

Medalists

See also 
 Slovakia at the Paralympics
 Slovakia at the 1998 Winter Olympics

References 

Slovakia at the Paralympics
1998 in Slovakia
Nations at the 1998 Winter Paralympics